James Alexander "Red-Eye" Hay (May 15, 1931 – May 17, 2018) was a Canadian professional ice hockey defenceman who played 74 games in the National Hockey League with the Detroit Red Wings between 1952 and 1955. The rest of his career, which lasted from 1947 to 1973, was spent in the minor leagues, mainly the Western Hockey League. He was included on 1954, 1955 Stanley Cup pictures with the Red Wings. His name was engraved on the Stanley Cup in 1955.

Career statistics

Regular season and playoffs

References

External links
 

1931 births
2018 deaths
Brandon Regals players
Canadian expatriate ice hockey players in the United States
Canadian ice hockey defencemen
Detroit Auto Club players
Detroit Red Wings players
Edmonton Flyers (WHL) players
Ice hockey people from Saskatchewan
Indianapolis Capitals players
Jersey Devils players
Omaha Knights (USHL) players
Portland Buckaroos players
Quebec Aces (QSHL) players
Salt Lake Golden Eagles (WHL) players
San Francisco Seals (ice hockey) players
Seattle Totems (WHL) players
Sherbrooke Saints players
Sportspeople from Saskatoon
Stanley Cup champions
Troy Bruins players
Windsor Spitfires players
Vancouver Canucks (WHL) players